Mount Vernon Nazarene University (MVNU) is a private Christian university in Mount Vernon, Ohio, with satellite locations in the surrounding area. It was founded in 1968 by the Church of the Nazarene and offers a variety of Bachelor's and Master's degrees to both traditional and non-traditional students.

History
The result of a 1960 education commission, Mount Vernon Nazarene was first chartered as the Zone A College of the Church of the Nazarene in 1964 by the church's General Assembly. A site in the town of Mount Vernon was chosen in 1966 for its proximity to a concentrated Nazarene population, and Mount Vernon Nazarene College (MVNC) opened in 1968 on the old Lakeholm Farm property that had belonged to The Ohio State University.

The Lakeholm Farm was the former home of Columbus Delano, US Secretary of the Interior under Ulysses S. Grant.
Three buildings (Manor, Ice House, and Barn) original to Lakeholm Farm, are still in operation on the campus today. Originally a two-year junior college, MVNU became a four-year school in 1974, was accredited for two-year degrees in 1972 and four-year degrees in 1974, and graduate degrees in Christian ministry were added in 1991. It was renamed Mount Vernon Nazarene University (MVNU) in 2002.

The town of Mount Vernon was just one of many sites proposed for the college, but it raised $209,000 USD to purchase a 209-acre portion of the Lakeholm Farm before the Church of the Nazarene bought it from The Ohio State University, which owned the property. The colonial-style buildings were designed to resemble Williamsburg, Virginia. Nine acres were added by Mary Starr in 1970, and the college acquired a neighboring  farm in 1999.

MVNU is a co-educational university with an evangelical Christian foundation and mission. It is part of the Church of the Nazarene's East Central District and much of its educational philosophy is based on the Wesleyan-Arminian holiness tradition. The university motto is: "To Seek to Learn is to Seek to Serve."

Organization and affiliation
MVNU is one of eight US colleges and universities affiliated with the Church of the Nazarene. MVNU is the university for the Nazarene East Central Region of the United States, which comprises the Northwestern Ohio, North Central Ohio, East Ohio, Southwestern Ohio, Central Ohio, Eastern Kentucky, West Virginia North, and West Virginia South districts (all of Ohio, part of Kentucky, and most of West Virginia).

The trustees of the university, organized in 1966, are representatives from each of these Ohio, Kentucky, and West Virginia districts. Each institution receives financial backing from the Nazarene churches in its region; part of each church budget is paid into a fund for its regional school. Each college or university is also bound by a gentlemen's agreement not to actively recruit outside its respective educational region.

MVNU is accredited by the Higher Learning Commission and all of its academic programs are submitted to the Ohio Board of Regents for approval. The university is a member of the Association of Independent Colleges and Universities of Ohio, the Council for Christian Colleges and Universities, the Council for Higher Education, and the Ohio Foundation of Independent Colleges.

Campus
MVNU's main campus is along the southern edge of Mount Vernon, Ohio. The campus consists of over fifteen different classroom and residence buildings. The main classroom buildings are Faculty Hall, Regents Hall, Founders Hall, The Clarence and Jennie K. Moore Center, and Jetter Hall. Freshmen entering the school live in one of three dorms: Pioneer or Galloway for freshman girls, and Oakwood for freshman boys. Upperclassmen have the option of staying in Galloway Hall (girls) or Redwood Hall (boys) or moving to one of the apartment complexes on campus. These apartments are Cedar, Birch, and Cypress (upperclassmen boys) and Maplewood, Elmwood, Rosewood, and Spruce (upperclassmen girls).

Other buildings on campus include the R.R. Hodges Chapel, Hyson Campus Center, Ariel Arena and the Prince Student Union, and Hunter Hall, The Stephen W. Nease Center and the Buchwald Center in downtown Mount Vernon. The R.R. Hodges chapel is where most chapel services take place on campus and is also the center of all music and performing arts classes and performances on campus. Hyson Campus Center houses the Dining Commons, the Student Life offices, the campus post office, and several classrooms. Ariel Arena is MVNU's athletics facility, opened on November 8, 2013. Connected to the arena is the Prince Student Union, which houses the campus cafe, "The 586.”

MVNU also owns several buildings in downtown Mount Vernon. The first of these is Hunter Hall, which houses the university's nursing program and Happy Bean Coffee Shop. This building now contains high-tech educational technology and simulation equipment for nursing students as well as Hunter Hall Clinic for Communication Sciences and Disorders. Next door to Hunter Hall is Buchwald Center, open since 2009, which contains classrooms for Fine Art and Graphic Design majors and the Schnormeier Art Gallery. A couple buildings down is The Stephen W. Nease Center that houses MVNU's Department of Engineering and the community makerspace, Knox Labs, Inc.

MVNU also has satellite locations in Columbus-New Albany, Mansfield, and Newark that serve the Graduate and Professional Studies Program for non-traditional students. The Columbus-New Albany site was opened on July 1, 2013, and features state-of-the-art technology for students and faculty, along with convenient access from all areas of Columbus. It is MVNU's newest satellite location, replacing the Gahanna and Polaris locations that the university previously operated.

Academics

Traditional undergraduate

MVNU has programs for traditional students, graduate students, and working adults. 88% of all degrees awarded are bachelor's degrees and the Fall 2018 acceptance rate for undergraduate students who applied to the university was 75.8. The student-to-faculty ratio is 16:1, and 68% of full-time professors hold a terminal degree. Many of the faculty members completed their training at one of the other Nazarene institutions of higher education. In 2018, the retention rate was 79% and the average ACT score of MVNU students was 23.

MVNU is organized into six schools: Arts and Humanities, Business, Education and Professional Studies, Theology and Philosophy, Nursing and Health Sciences, and Natural and Social Sciences. Within these six schools the university offers a variety of degree programs for traditional undergraduate students. The five most popular majors on campus are Business, Nursing, Education, Biology, and Engineering.

Graduate and Professional Studies Program
The Graduate and Professional Studies Program (GPS) is for non-traditional students and offers associate's, bachelor's and master's degrees. Mount Vernon Nazarene University offered its first Bachelor of Business Administration (BBA) degree program designed for adults to 22 students at the Mount Vernon campus in 1993. By 1995, MVNU added a second site at Polaris Parkway in Columbus. Today, nearly 1,300 students are enrolled in Graduate and Professional Studies programs (GPS) through several locations around Ohio. Five BBA concentrations are now offered as well as undergraduate degrees in social work, leadership, ministry leadership, public administration, education, and nursing; graduate degrees in business, education, and ministry; general studies courses, and certificate programs in education and ministry. Many online degree programs are also available.

WNZR
WNZR, operating at a frequency of 90.9 FM MHz, signed on the air in October 1986. The station is owned and operated by Mount Vernon Nazarene University. The station's studios are located in Founders Hall and are part of the university's Communication Department and the School of Arts and Humanities. WNZR's broadcast tower and transmitter building is located off of Glen Road on the east end of the campus. The station serves a dual purpose as a laboratory for radio broadcasting classes and a broadcast ministry of MVNU.
 
WNZR is licensed by the Federal Communications Commission as a non-commercial educational (NCE) station, and is located in the NCE range of the FM bandwidth. WNZR was originally licensed to operate around 140 watts. In May 2008, the station was approved for a power increase up to 1300 watts and went live with a new transmitter on May 21, 2010. WNZR's signal now reaches into bordering counties (Licking, Morrow, and Richland). WNZR also streams online at www.wnzr.fm and has a smartphone app available on both the Google Play/Android platform and on the iTunes App Store.
 
WNZR is funded through support from the university's general academic budget, donations from listeners, and underwriting support from area businesses and organizations. It operates 24 hours a day, seven days a week, 365 days a year, broadcasting primarily an Adult Contemporary (AC) Christian music format, along with a variety of Christian teaching programs and athletic events. Core music artists at WNZR include Natalie Grant, Chris Tomlin, Casting Crowns, Third Day, MercyMe, Toby Mac, Jeremy Camp, Mandisa, Building 429, Steven Curtis Chapman, Francesca Battistelli, For King & Country, and the Newsboys.

Student life
Enrollment in 2018 consisted of 2,243 students, 1,405 of whom were traditional and 838 non-traditional undergraduates. 15% of students represented racial minorities, 92% of students were from the state of Ohio, 23% were associated with the Church of the Nazarene, 63% were female, and 36% were male. 72% of students lived on campus.

While on campus, students participate in student-led small groups, chapel services, mission trips, and community service groups organized and directed by upperclassmen. Counseling, Career Services, and Student Health Services are available to students at no cost.

The Student Government Association (SGA) is responsible for many of the events that take place on campus. It consists of 13 members who are responsible for various aspects of community life, from planning events to influencing policies on important issues. These members are elected yearly by the student body and include a president of each class, social, community and spiritual life, and other areas. Members of the SGA participate in meetings with the board of trustees, faculty, staff, and administration. In past years, the SGA has been responsible for the end of the year Block Party and a change in policy that allowed more open dorm hours for the residence halls and apartment living areas.

Some campus events and traditions that take place annually are Welcome Week, Oaktoberfest, SonFest, and Block Party. Welcome Week includes activities such as a luau and dime-a-dog for sporting events. Oaktoberfest takes place on the lawn in front of Oakwood Hall and features hay rides, s'mores, and pumpkin carving. SonFest is one of the region's largest Christian music concerts, with yearly attendance numbering in the thousands. Taking place on the campus of MVNU, the event has previously featured popular artists that include Family Force Five, Plumb, Building 429, Switchfoot, and Lecrae. The Block Party is held to celebrate the end of the year and is hosted by the SGA. Loud music and outdoor games are signature attractions of this event.

Athletics

The Mount Vernon Nazarene (MVNU) athletic teams are called the Cougars. The university is a member of the National Association of Intercollegiate Athletics (NAIA), primarily competing in the Crossroads League (formerly known as the Mid-Central College Conference (MCCC) until after the 2011–12 school year) since the 2011–12 academic year. The Cougars previously competed in the defunct American Mideast Conference from 1975–76 to 2010–11.

MVNU competes in 21 varsity sports: Men's sports include baseball, basketball, bowling, cross country, golf, lacrosse, soccer, tennis, track & field and volleyball; while women's sports include basketball, bowling, cross country, golf, lacrosse, soccer, softball, tennis, track & field and volleyball; and co-ed sports include cheerleading and eSports.

MVNU has added men's volleyball as a varsity sport for the 2020–21 season, with the sport spending the 2019–20 season as a club sport.

Facilities
MVNU hosts most of their sports at on-campus facilities, the newest of which is Ariel Arena. Opened in 2013, the arena was funded by the Ariel Corporation and is named for it. The main arena seats 2,100 for athletic events and 3,000 for concerts, performances and other events. The arena is attached to MVNU's older gymnasium, formerly known as the Physical Education Center, which provides auxiliary courts for practices. The arena also hosts a cardio center, weight room, athletics offices and classrooms. MVNU also has a baseball field built next to Ariel Arena, and a softball field and tennis courts found west of Martinsburg Road.

In addition to current facilities, MVNU has begun (2019) construction on a new soccer and lacrosse complex on the north side of campus. The new facility will feature a turf field, lights, grandstand seating for 500 spectators, locker rooms and additional amenities. The project is part of a larger community area that will include five grass soccer fields, and is built next to a new indoor facility being built by Mount Vernon High School. MVNU and MVHS will share access to both the soccer and lacrosse stadium and the indoor facility.

Accomplishments
In the 2018–19 season, MVNU saw great success on the field. The Cougars’ men's basketball program returned to the NAIA Division II National Tournament for the first time since 2009, reaching the second round. MVNU also had a number of NAIA All-Americans, most notably Mitchell Soviak, who won the NAIA Men's Outdoor Track and Field National Championship in shot put.

Intramurals
MVNU also supports a wide variety of intramural sports, such as tennis, softball, sand volleyball, indoor volleyball and flag football.

Notes and references

External links
 Official website
 Official athletics website

 
Educational institutions established in 1968
Liberal arts colleges in Ohio
Private universities and colleges in Ohio
Education in Knox County, Ohio
Buildings and structures in Knox County, Ohio
Evangelicalism in Ohio
Council for Christian Colleges and Universities
1968 establishments in Ohio